Harvey Stevens (8 August 1930 – 15 December 2016) was an Australian rules footballer who played with Footscray and Collingwood in the Victorian Football League (VFL).

Stevens started his career in 1948 at Collingwood and played in their 1952 Grand Final before being released by the club during the summer.

In 1953, Stevens joined Footscray, the club his father Arthur had played for. He won the Footscray best and fairest award that year.

Stevens is a member of Footscray's first premiership winning side, playing as a ruckman in the 1954 VFL Grand Final.

His grandsons are Daniel Talia who played for the Adelaide Football Club, and Michael Talia who played for the Western Bulldogs and the Sydney Swans.

Stevens died on 14 December 2016, aged 86.

References

External links

1930 births
2016 deaths
Australian rules footballers from Victoria (Australia)
Western Bulldogs players
Western Bulldogs Premiership players
Collingwood Football Club players
Charles Sutton Medal winners
One-time VFL/AFL Premiership players